Dogwoof is a film-distribution company based in the United Kingdom.

History

Dogwoof Pictures 
Dogwoof was founded in 2003 by Andy Whittaker, and originally concentrated on foreign films, including such titles as Don't Move, Fateless, El Lobo, and Esma's Secret.  They recently began to distribute documentaries such as Black Gold, Crude Awakening, and The Devil Came On Horseback.

In July 2005, the company experimented by distributing James Erskine's EMR simultaneously in cinemas, on the internet through Tiscali (ISP), and on DVD through its Home Entertainment division.  The move was notable since most films are released through different distribution channels on a staggered schedule, giving each channel an exclusive release window. Exhibitors were especially wary, as many feared that they would eventually lose their exclusive release windows for more mainstream films.

In 2005 Dogwoof launched the UK Digital Screen Network DSN at the Curzon Soho cinema.  Political thriller King's Game was shown from a digital print as opposed to 35mm at the Curzon Soho cinema in London at a commercial matinee performance. The cinema installed the digital projector as part of the Phase 1 roll-out of the UK Film Council Digital Screen Network.

In 2009 Dogwoof distributed the documentary The Age of Stupid, The End of the Line, Burma VJ, We Live in Public and Afghan Star.

In 2010 Dogwoof announced a deal with technology company Cisco to build social media websites using the Cisco Eos platform for each film release.  Dogwoof was the first European customer for Cisco Eos.  The first website launched was Good with Film.

Dogwoof has so far released 28 Oscar-nominated documentaries, with four wins and an additional three BAFTA winners; notable titles include Oscar-winning and BAFTA-winning Free Solo (the UK's highest-grossing documentary of 2018), BAFTA-nominated Apollo 11 (the UK's highest-grossing documentary of 2019), double-Oscar-nominated and BAFTA-nominated Collective, BAFTA-winning The Act of Killing, and Blackfish. Dogwoof is increasingly ramping up its production activities, and recent titles it has financed and produced include Playing with Sharks (Sundance 2021, sold to National Geographic), The Lost Leonardo (Tribeca 2021, sold to Sony Pictures Classics), Citizen Ashe (Telluride 2021, sold to CNN / HBO Max), and McEnroe (Tribeca 2022, sold to Showtime).

Dogwoof started 2022 with five Sundance films: Navalny by Daniel Roher, which won both the US Documentary Audience Award and the Audience Favourite Award; The Territory by Alex Pritz, which won both the World Documentary Audience Award and a World Cinema Documentary Special Jury Award; Midwives by Snow Hnin Ei Hlaing, which won a World Cinema Documentary Special Jury Award; Jono McLeod's My Old School featuring Alan Cumming; and Riotsville, USA from Sierra Pettengill. It recently launched four films at Tribeca: Lynch/Oz by Alexandre O Philippe, McEnroe by Barney Douglas, Hallelujah: Leonard Cohen, a Journey, a Song by Dayna Goldfine and Dan Geller, and Dreaming Walls: Inside the Chelsea Hotel by Maya Duverdier and Amelie van Elmbt, executive produced by Martin Scorsese.

Dogwoof Sales 
In 2011 Dogwoof launched Dogwoof Sales, the international sales arm of Dogwoof Ltd, that has established itself as a sales agents for documentaries like Blackfish, Dior and I, Weiner and Cartel Land, offering filmmakers representation, alongside raising finance, UK theatrical distribution and direct to consumer global distribution via an international network of online and theatrical partners.

TDog Productions 
TDog is Dogwoof's invite-only production fund. The fund launched in 2016 in order to support the making of documentaries across the world.

Filmography

Film distribution
Dogwoof has distributed many films including:

EMR (2003)
Seducing Doctor Lewis (2003)
Don't Move (2004)
King's Game (2004)
Fateless (2005)
El Lobo (2005)
Four Eyed Monsters (2005)
Man Push Cart (2005)
Viva Zapatero! (2005)
Disarm (2005)
Mouth to Mouth (2005)
Play (2005)
Sorstalanság (2005)
Brasileirinho - Grandes Encontros do Choro (2005)
Viva Zapatero! (2005)
Grbavica (2006)
Girlfriend in a Kimono (2006)
Bunny Chow (2006)
Knallhart (2006)
Black Gold (2007)
Nadzieja (2007)
Orthodox Stance (2007)
Hell on Wheels (2007)
Off the Grid: Life on the Mesa (2007)
The Devil Came on Horseback (2007)
Up the Yangtze (2007) 
Les Petites vacances (2007) 
Crude awakening (2008)
The End of America (2008)
Boogie (2008)
Fierce Light (2008)
Nollywood Babylon (2008)
No Impact Man: The Documentary (2009)
The Yes Men Fix the World (2009)
We Live in Public (2009)
The Age of Stupid (2009)
The End of the Line (2009)
Food, Inc. (2009)
Bananas!* (2009)
Mugabe and the White African (2009)
Waterlife (2009)
Burma VJ (2009)
H2Oil (2009)
Dirty Oil (2009)
Vanishing of the Bees (2009)
Edge (2010)
Videocracy (2010)
Restrepo (2010)
Client 9: The Rise and Fall of Eliot Spitzer (2010)
Just Do It. (2011)
Dreams of a Life (2011)
The Interrupters (2011)
Bill Cunningham: New York (2011)
Marina Abramovic: The Artist Is Present (2012)
The Queen of Versailles (2012)
The House I Live In (2012)
Chasing Ice (2012)
Blackfish (2013)
The Spirit of '45 (2013)
The Act of Killing (2013)
Muscle Shoals (2013)
Cutie and the Boxer (2013)
Dark Days (2001)
The Unknown Known (2014)
The Case Against 8 (2014)
Advanced Style  (2014)
Life Itself (2014)
Concerning Violence (2014)
The Overnighters (2014)
The Last Impresario (2014)
Mistaken for Strangers (2014)
The Punk Singer (2014)
Manakamana (2014)
The Look of Silence (2015)
Best of Enemies (2015)
The Fear of 13 (2015)
Dior and I (2015)
Cartel Land (2015)
Fresh Dressed (2015)
Dreamcatcher (2015)
3 1/2 Minutes, 10 Bullets (2015)
Peggy Guggenheim: Art Addict (2015)
The Show of Shows (2015)
Unbranded (2015)
The Black Panthers: Vanguard of the Revolution (2015)
Iris (2015)
Janis: Little Girl Blue (2016)
Mavis! (2016)
Hitchcock/Truffaut (2016)
Speed Sisters (2016)
Mapplethorpe: Look at the Pictures (2016)
Heart of a Dog (2016)
Versus: The Life and Films of Ken Loach (2016)
Where to Invade Next (2016)
Weiner (2016)
Author: The JT LeRoy Story (2016)
Jim: The James Foley Story (2016)
Sour Grapes (2016)
The First Monday in May (2016)
Kate Plays Christine (2016)
Lo and Behold, Reveries of the Connected World (2016)
Life, Animated (2016)
Richard Linklater: Dream Is Destiny (2016)
Crazy About Tiffany's (2016)
LoveTrue (2016)
Gimme Danger (2016)
Born to Be Free (2016)
Dancer (2016)
13th (2016)
Troublemakers (2016)
Quest (2017)
The Work (2017)
City of Ghosts (2017)
The Reagan Show (2017)
Dina (2017)
78/52 (2017)
Mountain (2017)
Jane (2017)
Sachin: A Billion Dreams (2017)
Laura Poitras Collection (2017)
All This Panic (2017)
Cameraperson (2017)
O.J.: Made in America (2017)
Dries (2017)
George Best: All by Himself (2017)
Risk (2017)
Citizen Jane: Battle for the City (2017)
Whitney: Can I Be Me (2017)
RGB (2017)
The Final Year (2018)
Makala (2018)
The Ice King (2018)
Bombshell: The Hedy Lamarr Story (2018)
Westwood (2018)
Free Solo (2018)
On Her Shoulders (2019)
America (2019)
Maiden (2019)
Minding The Gap (2019)
Last Breath (2019)
XY Chelsea (2019)
Halston (2019)
Apollo 11 (2019)
The Brink (2019)
Marianne & Leonard: Words of Love (2019)
Hail Satan? (2019)
Memory: The Origins of Aliens (2019)
Honeyland (2019)
Sea of Shadows (2019)
Mystify: Michael Hutchence (2019)
Making Waves: The Art of Cinematic Sound (2019)
The Amazing Jonathan Documentary (2019)
The Cave (2019)
The Kingmaker (2019)
Midnight Traveller (2020)
When Lambs Become Lions (2020)
Midnight Family (2020)
Cunningham (2020)
Martin Margiela: In His Own Words (2020)
Diana Kennedy: Nothing Fancy (2020)
Mike Wallace is Here (2020)
The Australian Dream (2020)
On the Record (2020)
Spaceship Earth (2020)
The Fight (2020)
My Rembrandt (2020)
Max Richter’s Sleep (2020)
Rebuilding Paradise (2020)
I Am Greta (2020)
The Painter and the Thief (2020)
Collectived (2020)
The Mole Agent (2020)
Mayor (2021)
Sing Me a Song (2021)
MLK/FBI (2021)
76 Days (2021)
Assassins (2021)
A Glitch in The Matrix (2021)
IWOW: I Walk on Water (2021)
Stray (2021)
Truman & Tennessee: An Intimate Conversation (2021)
Some Kind of Heaven (2021)
Last Man Standing (2021)
The Most Beautiful Boy In The World (2021)
WeWork (2021)
Sabaya (2021)
The Lost Leonardo (2021)
FAUCI (2021)
The Alpinist (2021)
The Rescue (2021)
Becoming Cousteau (2021)
The First Wave (2021)
Citizen Ashe (2021)
The Story of Film: A New Generation (2021)
Ailey (2022)
Torn (2022)
Taming The Garden (2022)
The Sanctity of Space (2022)
River (2022)
Navalny (2022)
Ennio (2022)
McEnroe (2022)
Fire of Love (2022)
My Old School (2022)
The Territory (2022)
Midwives (2022)
All That Breathes (2022)
Retrograde (2022)
Lynch/Oz (2022)

International sales 

How Much Does Your Building Weigh, Mr. Foster? (2010)
Tabloid (2010)
Melissa, Mom & Me (2010)
Girl Model (2011)
Sound It Out (2011)
Town of Runners (2012)
Marina Abramovic: The Artist Is Present (2012)
Jason Becker: Not Dead Yet (2012)
The House I Live In (2012)
Village at the End of the World (2012)
The Ridge (2012)
In the Shadow of the Sun (2012)
The Network (2012)
112 Weddings (2013)
Blackfish (2013)
Dangerous Acts Starring the Unstable Elements of Belarus (2013)
InRealLife (2013)
The Case Against 8 (2013)
Supermensch: The Legend of Shep Gordon (2013)
The Last Impresario (2013)
Dinosaur 13 (2014)
Advanced Style (2014)
Finding Fela (2014)
Print the Legend (2014)
Web Junkie (2014)
Lambert & Stamp (2014)
Dior and I (2015)
Love Is All: 100 Years of Love & Courtship (2015)
Chameleon (2015)
Censored Voices (2015)
Dreamcatcher (2015)
3 1/2 Minutes, 10 Bullets (2015)
Fresh Dressed (2015)
The Fear of 13 (2015)
Cartel Land (2015)
Unbranded (2015)
Only the Dead (2015)
Speed Sisters (2015)
The Show of Shows (2015)
Into the Inferno (2016)
Sour Grapes (2016)
Crazy About Tiffany's (2016)
Jim: The James Foley Story (2016)
Kate Plays Christine (2016)
Richard Linklater: Dream Is Destiny (2016)
Gringo: The Dangerous Life of John McAfee (2016)
Burden (2016)
Machine of Human Dreams (2016)
Mapplethorpe: Look at the Pictures (2016)
Weiner (2016)
Born to Be Free (2016)
Life, Animated (2016)
LoveTrue (2016)
The Confession (2016)
Dreaming of Wine (2016)
Maurizio Cattelan: Be Right Back (2016)
Versus: The Life and Films of Ken Loach (2016)
The Fall (2016)
Chasing Asylum (2016)
Author: The JT LeRoy Story (2016)
Forever Pure (2016)
Liberation Day (2016)
Citizen Jane: Battle for the City (2016)
Antonio Lopez 1970: Sex Fashion & Disco (2017)
Have You Seen the Listers? (2017)
Kevyn Aucoin (2017)
Lots of Kids, a Monkey and a Castle (2017)
That Summer (2017)
This Is Congo (2017)
Mountain (2017)
Bombshell: The Hedy Lamarr Story (2017)
City of Ghosts (2017)
Dina (2017)
Dries (2017)
Motherland (2017)
The Departure (2017)
The Family (2017)
The Family I Had (2017)
The Reagan Show (2017)
The Work (2017)
Midsummer in Newtown (2017)
Human Flow (2017)
The Deminer (2017)
Studio 54 (2017)
Far From The Tree (2017)
Kusama - Infinity (2018)
Westwood: Punk, Icon, Activist (2018)
Generation Wealth (2018)
The Price of Everything (2018)
The Ice King (2018)
Ballet Now (2018)
Commander Arian (2018)
Matangi / Maya / M.I.A. (2018)
Chi-Town (2018)
The Eyes of Orson Welles (2018)
Under The Wire (2018)
For The Birds  (2018)
América (2018)
The Kleptokrats (2018)
When Lambs Become Lions  (2018)
Minding The Gap (2018)
Watergate (2018)
Maiden (2018)
Meeting Gorbachev (2018)
Halston (2018)
Dark Suns (2018)
One Child Nation (2019)
Resistance Fighters (2019)
Mike Wallace is Here (2019)
The Cult of The Family (2019)
Sea of Shadows (2019)
Cunningham (2019)
Nothing Fancy: Diana Kennedy (2019)
Mystify: Michael Hutchence (2019)
Making Waves: The Art of Cinematic Sound (2019)
XY Chelsea (2019)
Aquarela (2019)
The Cave (2019)
The Kingmaker (2019)
The Human Factor (2019)
King of The Cruise (2019)
Sing Me a Song (2019)
Truman & Tennessee: An Intimate Conversation (2020)
Be Water (2020)
Max Richter’s Sleep (2020)
Rebuilding Paradise (2020)
Mayor (2021)
Hillary (2020)
On The Record (2020)
Laurel Canyon (2020)
I Am Greta (2020)
76 Days (2020)
The First Woman (2020)
The Mole Agent (2020)
Stray (2021)
Playing With Sharks (2021)
Sabaya (2021)
Philly D.A. (2021)
Seeds of Deceit (2021)
Ailey (2021)
Captains of Zataari (2021)
The Gig Is Up (2021)
Viral Dreams (2021)
Faceless  (2021)
The Lost Leonardo (2021)
A Story of Film: A New Generation (2021)
The First Wave (2021) 
Becoming Cousteau (2021)
The Rescue (2021)
Citizen Ashe (2021)
Hallelujah: Leonard Cohen, A Journey A Song (2021)
River (2021)
Shane (2022)
McCurry: The Pursuit of Colour (2021)
The Territory (2022)
Riotsville, USA (2022)
Midwives  (2022)
My Old School (2022)
Nothing Lasts Forever(2022)
Dreaming Walls: Inside the Chelsea Hotel (2022)
How to Survive a Pandemic (2022)
Navalny (2022)
McEnroe (2022)
Million Dollar Pigeons (2022)
Elephant Mother (2022)
Lynch/Oz (2022)
My Name is Alfred Hitchcock (2022)
Free Money (2022)
Pray For Our Sinners (2022)
The Last Rider (2022)
Fragments of Paradise (2022)

Recognition
The Daily Telegraph writes that "London-based film-distribution company Dogwoof has carved out an impressive reputation for itself as a purveyor of timely and incisive social-issues documentaries".

References

External links
Dogwoof Pictures (gb) at the Internet Movie Database
Dogwoof Digital (gb) at the Internet Movie Database
Official website

Mass media companies established in 2003
Film distributors of the United Kingdom
Documentary film organizations
International sales agents